Sam Carrick (born February 4, 1992) is a Canadian professional ice hockey centre who currently plays with the  Anaheim Ducks of the National Hockey League (NHL). He was selected by the Toronto Maple Leafs in the fifth round, 144th overall, in the 2010 NHL Entry Draft.

Playing career

Junior career

As a youth, Carrick played in the 2005 Quebec International Pee-Wee Hockey Tournament with the Markham Waxers minor ice hockey team. Carrick played major junior hockey in the Ontario Hockey League (OHL) with the Brampton Battalion. He was a first round choice in the 2008 OHL Priority Selection draft. In his first season, Carrick was a part of the Brampton team that was defeated in the OHL final 4 games to 1 by the Windsor Spitfires. In his second season, Carrick set new highs in goals and points, which led him to chosen by the Toronto Maple Leafs in the fifth round, 144th overall, in the 2010 NHL Entry Draft. Carrick served as an alternate captain for his third season Brampton during the 2010–11 OHL season, registering 16 goals and 39 points in 59 games. He was named captain of the Battalion for the 2011–12 season. He was among the players credited with the Battalion's resurgence that season. He finished the season with junior career highs of 37 goals and 67 points in 68 games.

Professional career

On April 1, 2012, Carrick signed a three-year entry-level contract with the Toronto Maple Leafs. Toronto assigned Carrick to the East Coast Hockey League (ECHL) for at the beginning of the 2012–13 season, where he made his professional debut with the Idaho Steelheads. In 50 games with the Steelheads, Carrick scored 16 goals and 37 points. He was reassigned to the Maple Leafs American Hockey League (AHL) affiliate, the Toronto Marlies on March 1, 2013. He finished his rookie season with the Marlies scoring 2 goals in 19 games. In his first full season in the AHL he registered 14 goals in 62 games. He was named an alternate captain with the Marlies that season.

In the final year of his entry-level contract, Carrick had impressed during the pre-season training camp but was still assigned to the Marlies. Carrick received his first NHL recall by the Maple Leafs early into the 2014–15 season to replace an injured Joffrey Lupul. He made his NHL debut in a 3–2 victory over the Chicago Blackhawks on November 1, 2014. He would score his first NHL goal on March 26, 2015 against the Florida Panthers, and was named third star of the game. He played in 16 games with the Maple Leafs registering the one goal and two points. Carrick also added 9 goals and 26 points in 59 games with the Marlies. At the end of the season, he avoided becoming a restricted free agent when re-signed with the Maple Leafs on a one-year contract. In the 2015–16 season, Carrick put up 16 goals and 34 points in 52 games with the Marlies and played in 3 games with the Maple Leafs.

As an impending restricted free agent, Carrick was not tendered a qualifying offer from the Maple Leafs following the season and became an unrestricted free agent. On July 1, 2016, Carrick was signed to a one-year, two-way contract with the Chicago Blackhawks. Carrick was assigned to AHL affiliate, the Rockford IceHogs to begin the 2016–17 season. He was second in team scoring with 28 points in 53 games before at the NHL trade deadline, Carrick was dealt by the Blackhawks, along with Spencer Abbott to the Anaheim Ducks in exchange for Kenton Helgesen and a 7th round pick in the 2019 NHL Entry Draft on March 1, 2017. Carrick and Abbott were the top scores for the IceHogs at the time. 

Upon joining Anaheim, the Ducks assigned him to their AHL affiliate, the San Diego Gulls, where he would collect 11 points in 15 games. He added 7 points in 10 playoff games for the Gulls. On June 6, 2017, Carrick was re-signed to a two-year, two-way contract with Anaheim. During the 2018–19 season, Carrick played in 6 games for Anaheim earning his first point with the team on March 30, 2019 versus the Edmonton Oilers. He added 32 goals and 69 points with the Gulls that season, and 7 goals and 14 points in 16 playoff games. On June 29, 2019, the Ducks re-signed Carrick to a one-year contract. On October 18, 2019, Carrick was named captain of the Gulls. During the  2019–20 season, Carrick played in 9 games with the Ducks scoring his first goal (a shorthanded goal) versus the New York Islanders on December 21, 2019 and registering 23 goals and 43 points in 46 games with the Gulls. He was re-signed to another one-year contract by the Ducks on May 10, 2020.

During the pandemic-shortened 2020–21 season, Carrick played in 13 games with the Ducks, registering 2 goals and 6 points. In October Carrick was recalled from the Gulls early in the 2021–22 season. and after playing a career-high 64 games with Anaheim scoring 11 goals and 19 points, he was rewarded with a two-year contract extension. Carrick suffered a hip injury in September during the 2022–23 Ducks training camp, sidelining him for six months.

Personal information
Carrick is the son to John F. and Jane Carrick. John played junior C hockey with the Stouffville 70s. He is the second of four brothers who are all accomplished ice hockey players: brothers Jake Carrick (born 1990), Trevor Carrick (born 1994) and Josh Carrick (born 1995), have all played major junior ice hockey in the OHL. Trevor was drafted by the Carolina Hurricanes in the 2012 NHL Entry Draft and is currently playing with the San Diego Gulls of the AHL. Carrick is also a cousin to Bobby Hughes of the Gwinnett Gladiators in the ECHL.

Career statistics

Regular season and playoffs

International

References

External links

1992 births
Living people
Anaheim Ducks players
Brampton Battalion players
Canadian ice hockey centres
Ice hockey people from Ontario
Idaho Steelheads (ECHL) players
People from Whitchurch-Stouffville
Rockford IceHogs (AHL) players
San Diego Gulls (AHL) players
Toronto Maple Leafs draft picks
Toronto Maple Leafs players
Toronto Marlies players